Adventures of Frank and Jesse James is a 1948 Republic film serial directed by Fred C. Brannon and Yakima Canutt and starring Clayton Moore, Steve Darrell, Noel Neill, George J. Lewis, John Crawford, and Sam Flint.

Plot

Cast
 Clayton Moore as Jesse James a.k.a. John Howard
 Steve Darrell as Frank James a.k.a. Bob Carroll
 Noel Neill as Judy Powell
 George J. Lewis as Rafe Henley
 John Crawford as Amos Ramsey
 Sam Flint as Paul Thatcher

Production
Adventures of Frank and Jesse James was budgeted at $149,985 although the final negative cost was $149,805 (a $180, or 0.1%, under spend). It was the cheapest Republic serial of 1948, despite having one more chapter than the other two serials.

It was filmed between 5 April and 26 April 1948. The serial's production number was 1700.

This was the fourth of only four 13-chapter serials to be released by Republic. The previous three were released in 1947, the only original serials released in that year.

Release

Theatrical
Adventures of Frank and Jesse James''' official release date is 30 October 1948, although this is actually the date the sixth chapter was made available to film exchanges.

This was followed by a re-release of Darkest Africa, re-titled as King of Jungleland, instead of a new serial. The next new serial, Federal Agents vs. Underworld, Inc., followed in 1949.

The serial was re-released on 16 April 1956 between the similar re-releases of Manhunt of Mystery Island and King of the Rocket Men. The last original Republic serial release was King of the Carnival in 1955.

Stunts
 Tom Steele as Jesse James (doubling Clayton Moore)
 Dale Van Sickel as Rafe Henley (doubling George J. Lewis)

Special effects
 Lydecker brothers

Chapter titles
 Agent of Treachery (20min)
 The Hidden Witness (13min 20s)
 The Lost Tunnel (13min 20s)
 Blades of Death (13min 20s)
 Roaring Wheels (13min 20s)
 Passage to Danger (13min 20s)
 The Secret Code (13min 20s)
 Doomed Cargo (13min 20s)
 The Eyes of the Law (13min 20s)
 The Stolen Body (13min 20s)
 Suspicion/The Death Trap (13min 20s) - a re-cap chapter
 Talk or Die! (13min 20s)
 Unmasked (13min 20s)
Source:

See also
 List of film serials by year
 List of film serials by studio
 Jesse James Rides Again (1947) - earlier Jesse James serial
 The James Brothers of Missouri'' (1949) - later Jesse James serial

References

External links

 
 
 

1948 films
1948 Western (genre) films
American black-and-white films
Biographical films about Jesse James
1940s English-language films
Republic Pictures film serials
American Western (genre) films
Films directed by Yakima Canutt
1940s American films